George–Little Rock Community School District (G-LR) is a rural public school district headquartered at George–Little Rock Senior High School in George, Iowa. The district is mostly in Lyon County, with sections in Osceola and Sioux counties. In addition to George, it serves Little Rock.

History
The district formed on July 1, 2003, by the merger of the George and Little Rock school districts.

Steve Barber, formerly principal of Spencer Middle School in the Spencer Community School District, began serving as superintendent of G-LR in 2013. In 2017 he moved to the Atlantic Community School District. John Eyerly, formerly of the Westfield Community School District, replaced him on July 1, 2017. Eyerly resigned in 2019. Tom Luxford began serving his tenure as superintendent in the 2020–21 school year, succeeding interim superintendent Pat O’Donnell.

Schools
 George–Little Rock Senior High School (9–12) - George
 George–Little Rock Middle School (4–8) - Little Rock
 George–Little Rock Elementary School (PreK–3) - George

See also
List of school districts in Iowa

References

External links
 George–Little Rock Community School District
  (and of its predecessor districts)

School districts in Iowa
Education in Lyon County, Iowa
Education in Osceola County, Iowa
Education in Sioux County, Iowa
2003 establishments in Iowa
School districts established in 2003